De kalte ham Skarven is a 1965 Norwegian drama film directed by Wilfred Breistrand and Erik Folke Gustavson, starring Per Christensen and Liv Ullmann. The film is about a fisherman who has to face judgement on his life after an accident.

External links
 
 

1965 films
1965 drama films
Norwegian drama films
1960s Norwegian-language films